Chiang Tzu-ying (born September 15, 1984) is a Taiwanese former swimmer, who specialized in sprint freestyle events. Chiang competed for Chinese Taipei in the women's 50 m freestyle, as a 15-year-old, at the 2000 Summer Olympics in Sydney. She achieved a FINA B-cut of 27.03 from the National University Games in Taipei. She challenged seven other swimmers in heat five, including teenagers Marijana Šurković of Croatia and Jūratė Ladavičiūtė of Lithuania. She scorched the field by more than half a second (0.50) to power home with a leading finish in a sterling time of 26.84, sufficiently enough for her personal best. Chiang failed to advance into the semifinals, as she placed fortieth overall out of 74 swimmers in the prelims.

References

1984 births
Living people
Olympic swimmers of Taiwan
Swimmers at the 2000 Summer Olympics
Taiwanese female freestyle swimmers
Sportspeople from Taipei
Asian Games medalists in swimming
Asian Games bronze medalists for Chinese Taipei
Medalists at the 1998 Asian Games
Swimmers at the 1998 Asian Games